Sibirskaya is a station on the Dzerzhinskaya Line of the Novosibirsk Metro. It opened on December 31, 1987. This is a transfer station to Krasny Prospekt of the Leninskaya Line.

Novosibirsk Metro stations
Railway stations in Russia opened in 1987
Tsentralny City District, Novosibirsk
Railway stations located underground in Russia